Ulf Sundelin (born 26 August 1943) is a retired Swedish sailor. Together with his younger brothers Peter and Jörgen he won a gold medal in the 5.5 metre class at the 1968 Olympics and a silver medal at the 1969 World Championships. The brothers also won the 1971 world title in the three-person keelboat (Dragon class) and placed sixth at the 1972 Olympics.

References

1943 births
Living people
Swedish male sailors (sport)
Olympic sailors of Sweden
Sailors at the 1968 Summer Olympics – 5.5 Metre
Sailors at the 1972 Summer Olympics – Dragon
Olympic gold medalists for Sweden
Olympic medalists in sailing
Royal Swedish Yacht Club sailors
Medalists at the 1968 Summer Olympics
5.5 Metre class sailors
Dragon class sailors
Soling class sailors
World Champions in 5.5 Metre
World champions in sailing for Sweden